Kalarkoppa is a village in Belagavi district in Karnataka, India. The NH 4 passes through this village.

References

Villages in Belagavi district